Margreta de Grazia  (born 1946) is a scholar of Shakespeare, an Emerita Professor of English and the Humanities at the University of Pennsylvania. A Guggenheim Fellow, she is best known for her critical reappraisals of Shakespeare's oeuvre and her editions of the Cambridge Companion to Shakespeare and the New Cambridge Companion to Shakespeare.

Life
Margreta de Grazia was born in 1946 to Sebastian de Grazia, one of his five children. She attended Bryn Mawr College, receiving her undergraduate degree in 1968. She obtained master's (1970) and doctoral degrees (1974) in English renaissance studies from Princeton University.

de Grazia was briefly married in her youth. She married Colin Thubron, a travel writer, in 2010.

Career
de Grazia taught at the University of New Mexico and at Georgetown University, before joining the University of Pennsylvania in 1983. She held several named professorial positions there, among others the Rosenberg Professor of Humanities. In 1994, she was made a Guggenheim Fellow.,

In 2003, she was awarded the Ira H. Abrams Memorial Award for Distinguished Teaching by the university. The Royal Society of Literature elected her as a Fellow in 2021.

Research
In 1991 came out de Grazia's book Shakespeare Verbatim: The Reproduction of Authenticity and the 1790 Apparatus. Its subject was the publication of The Plays and Poems of William Shakespeare by Edmond Malone in 1790, which served as the foundation for a new model of Shakespeare studies, propelled by Enlightenment ideas and focusing on chronology, biography and authenticity. In contrast to Renaissance searches for authenticity, de Grazia argued that Malone forced Shakespeare as a subject in its own right, a historical construct, by setting up an analytical practice that continued to modern times, and she persuasively located Malone's place in Shakespeare studies by critiquing facile assumptions made by others on scholarly progress.

de Grazia's 2007 book, "Hamlet without Hamlet" attempted to overturn two centuries of critical appraisal of the play, where the character was variously treated as a "progenitor of modern consciousness" and removed from the play itself. She averred that at the time of the play, Hamlet was seen as a representation of a failed state, a reference to dynastic rises and falls, and she demonstrated how these themes were linked into the play. Such critics as Hegel saw Hamlet's disposession as a kickstart of his self-realisation, introspection and journey into modernity, but de Grazia countered this idea by suggesting that he wasn't, in fact, lost within his interior world and that this was rather a plot device for him to demonstrate his unhappiness with his disposession. The book was critiqued for lack of attention to modern stagings of the play and for overstating the break between the critical model of the first 200 years and the following centuries, but was nevertheless considered an exemplary addition to Shakespeare studies.

Selected works

References 

Bryn Mawr College alumni
Fellows of the Royal Society of Literature
1946 births
Princeton University alumni
Shakespearean scholars
Living people